Kollam Junction railway station (station code: QLN) is a junction station situated in the city of Kollam in Kerala, India. It is the second largest railway station in Kerala in terms of area and largest in terms of number of tracks and one of the oldest railway stations in the state.
It is also the second busiest railway station in Kerala in terms of trains handled per day. World's third longest railway platform is situated at Kollam railway station.

Kollam Junction lies on Kollam–Thiruvananthapuram trunk line. It is operated by the Southern Railway zone of the Indian Railways and comes under the Thiruvananthapuram railway division. It is one among the few railway stations in Kerala having two terminals with ticket counter facility. Three express trains have been originating from Kollam Junction railway station to South Indian cities of Chennai and Visakhapatnam: Visakhapatnam–Kollam Express (weekly), Anantapuri Express (daily) and Chennai Egmore–Kollam Junction Express (daily).

History

Kollam was the fifth city in Kerala to be connected to the nascent Indian Railways. The idea of a rail link from Chennai to Kollam, then the trading capital of the Travancore Kingdom was first conceived in 1873. The line was sanctioned by the Madras Presidency in 1899 and a survey completed in 1900. The railway line was built jointly by South Indian railway, Travancore state and the Madras Presidency. Kollam's (Anglicized Quilon) railway station was built in 1904 by Sree Moolam Tirunal Rama Varma, Maharaja of Travancore. It was the ruler's desire to create a rail link between Quilon, the then commercial capital of his State and Madras. The metre-gauge line from Quilon to Punalur was inaugurated on 1June 1904. The Quilon-Sengottai railway line was inaugurated on 26November 1904. The meter gauge line was later extended to Chala at Trivandrum via Paravur and Varkala and inaugurated on 4January 1918 Fund allotted for the extension of meter gauge railway line from Quilon to Ernakulam via  on 1952 and is inaugurated on 6January 1958. The metre-gauge lines between Kollam and Ernakulam were converted to broad gauge in 1975 and inaugurated on 13September 1976. The broad gauge conversion between the Punalur and Quilon sections was inaugurated on 12May 2010.

There was once a  metre-gauge line connecting Quilon Junction and Ashramam Maidan. During the inauguration of the Kollam-Punalur metre-gauge line in 1904, parts of locomotives which were to be used for Quilon–Schencottah line were shipped to Quilon Port from Tuticorin Port. They were assembled at the Ashramam Maidan, which was an open ground. The line was laid to carry these locomotives to the main station. The line was dismantled in 2000 to allow for city expansion. There was also a turntable in Kollam Junction railway station till 2015. Indian Railways removed it to pave way for the developments related to MEMU Shed.

Layout
There are a total of 17 tracks in the Kollam railway station, 2 lines are passing through the MEMU shed. The station has 6 platforms for handling long distance, passenger, MEMU & goods trains. The platform 1 is divided into two sections. Platform 1A handles the trains to Punalur–Sengottai line and platform 1 handles trains towards Trivandrum Central. The platform 1 and 1A together have a length of 1,180.5 m making them together the third longest railway platform in India. The station has an MEMU shed which is situated near to Platform 1A. An FCI godown owned and operated by Food Corporation of India is also situated near Kollam junction.

Location
Surrounding transport hubs:
Nearest bus stations Andamukkam City bus stand (1.2 km) and Kollam KSRTC Bus Station (2 km)
Nearest sea port: Kollam Port (3 km)
Nearest ferry terminal: Kollam KSWTD Ferry Terminal (2 km)
Nearest airport: Trivandrum International Airport (67 km) and Kollam Helipad (Old Airport) (0.5 km)

Annual passenger earnings
The annual passenger earnings from Kollam railway station shows a steady growth for several decades.

MEMU Shed

It was formally commissioned on 1 December 2013, five years after its completion. Now the railways is operating three pairs of Kollam–Ernakulam (via Alappuzha and Kottayam) via both the routes and a Kollam–Kanyakumari (via Trivandrum, Nagercoil) services from Kollam. Kollam MEMU Shed is the largest MEMU Shed in Kerala, which is equipped with most modern facilities.

Services
There are three express train services originating from Kollam Junction, viz., Kollam–Visakhapatnam Express, Anantapuri Express and Kollam Junction–Chennai Egmore Express. The services connect Chennai Egmore and Visakhapatnam cities with Kollam.

Future
Kollam Junction is one among the 25 stations in the country selected for first phase redevelopment at international standards along with Ernakulam Junction and Ernakulam Town stations.

The modernization works of the old terminal including works for lifts, escalators, new air conditioned waiting area etc. have been initiated in the railway station but not yet completed.

Google's High-speed Wi-Fi service
Kollam is among the first 100 railway stations in India selected for providing high-speed Wi-Fi services by Google, named as ‘Project Nilgiri’. There are 5 railway stations from Kerala in the initial stage. The service inaugurated at Kollam station on 26 December 2016 by Suresh Prabhu, Railway Minister of India, through video conferencing.

Kollam Junction to get modernization of international standards
On 18 September 2019, Indian Railways assured the modernization of Kollam Junction railway station to international standards. Kollam is one of the five railway stations in Kerala to be modernized.

Other suburban railway stations nearby

Incidents
 The engine of 56307 passenger derailed on 6 July 2018.
 The engine of 16723 Express caught fire at Kollam Junction on 16 July 2018.

See also

 Kollam
 Railway platform
 Kollam MEMU Shed
 Kollam–Thiruvananthapuram trunk line
 Kollam–Sengottai branch line
 Annual passenger earnings details of railway stations in Kerala
 Visakhapatnam railway station

References

Railway stations in Kollam district
Railway stations in Kollam
Buildings and structures in Kollam
Thiruvananthapuram railway division
Railway junction stations in Kerala
Railway stations opened in 1904
1904 establishments in India